Matamoros  is one of the 67 municipalities of Chihuahua, in northern Mexico. The municipal seat lies at Mariano Matamoros (aka "Villa Matamoros"). The municipality covers an area of 
1,139.5 km².

As of 2010, the municipality had a total population of 4,499, up from 4,304 as of 2005. 

The municipality had 109 localities, the largest of which (with 2010 population in parentheses) was: Mariano Matamoros (2,615), classified as urban.

Geography

Towns and villages
The municipality has 46 localities. The largest are:

References

Municipalities of Chihuahua (state)